Francis Ronald Olaki is a Ugandan professional footballer who plays as a striker or left winger for Buildcon F.C. in Zambia .

Personal life
He is the younger brother of Emmanuel Okwi, a member of the Uganda national football team and currently playing for Simba Sports Club in Tanzania.

References

Living people
Uganda A' international footballers
2014 African Nations Championship players
Ugandan footballers
Ugandan expatriate sportspeople in Botswana
1995 births

Association football forwards
Uganda international footballers
Ugandan expatriate footballers
Expatriate footballers in Botswana
Expatriate footballers in Zambia
Ugandan expatriate sportspeople in Albania
Expatriate footballers in Albania
2016 African Nations Championship players